The 1984 Canadian federal election was held on September 4, 1984, to elect members to the House of Commons of the 33rd Parliament of Canada. 

In one of the largest landslide victories in Canadian political history, the Progressive Conservative Party (PC Party), led by Brian Mulroney, defeated the incumbent governing Liberal Party led by Prime Minister John Turner. This was the first election since 1958 in which the PC Party won a majority government.

Mulroney's victory came as a result of his building of a 'grand coalition' that comprised social conservatives from the West, Red Tories from the East, Quebec nationalists, and fiscal conservatives. Mulroney's PCs won the largest number of seats in Canadian history (at 211) and his party also won the second-largest percentage of seats in Canadian history (at 74.8%), only ranking behind Progressive Conservative Prime Minister John Diefenbaker's triumph in the 1958 federal election (at 78.5%). This was the last time that the winning party won every province and territory and the last time that the winning party received over 50% of the national popular vote. The Liberals suffered what at that time was the worst defeat for a governing party at the federal level (in terms of percentage of seats). The New Democratic Party (NDP) held on to nearly all of their seats.

The election marked the end of the Liberals' long dominance of federal politics in Quebec, a province which had been the bedrock of Liberal support for almost a century; they did not win a majority of Quebec seats again until three decades later in 2015.

Background

The election was fought almost entirely on the record of the Liberals, who had been in power for all but one year since 1963.

Pierre Trudeau, who had been Prime Minister from 1968 to 1979 and again since 1980, retired from politics in early 1984. He was succeeded by John Turner, a former Cabinet minister under both Trudeau and Lester B. Pearson.

Turner had been out of politics for nine years. Upon assuming the leadership, he made immediate changes in an attempt to rebuild the Liberals' struggling reputation. For example, he announced that he would not run in a by-election to return to the House of Commons, but would instead run in the next general election as the Liberal candidate in the British Columbia riding of Vancouver Quadra. This was a sharp departure from usual practice, in which the incumbent in a safe seat resigns to allow a newly elected party leader a chance to get into Parliament. But the Liberal Party had lost favour with western Canadians, and policies such as the National Energy Program only aggravated this sentiment. Turner's plan to run in a western Canada riding was, in part, an attempt to rebuild support in that region. Going into the election, the Liberals held only one seat west of Ontario—that of Lloyd Axworthy, from Winnipeg—Fort Garry, Manitoba.

More seriously, there was great disaffection in Quebec with the Liberal government, despite their traditional support for the party. Conflict between the provincial and federal parties, a series of scandals, and the 1982 patriation of the Canadian constitution without the approval of the Quebec provincial government had damaged the Liberals' brand in the province. Hoping for success in Quebec, leader Joe Clark began actively courting soft nationalist voters in the province. This was also a main reason why businessman Brian Mulroney, a fluently bilingual native of Quebec, was chosen as Clark's replacement.

Although Turner was not required to call an election until 1985, internal data initially showed that the Liberals had regained the lead in opinion polls. Turner and his advisers were also mindful of the fact that Trudeau had seemingly missed an opportunity to take advantage of favourable opinion polls in the latter half of the 1970s, when he waited the full five years to call an election only to go down to an (albeit temporary) defeat. Another factor was that the majority that the Liberals had won at the previous election had slowly been eroded in the years that followed, as a result of several by-election losses and floor-crossings. Turner's minority government left it in serious danger of being toppled by a motion of no confidence. With this in mind, the new Prime Minister requested that Queen Elizabeth II delay her tour of Canada, and asked Governor-General Jeanne Sauvé to dissolve Parliament on July 9. In accordance with Canadian constitutional practice, Sauvé granted the request and set the election for September 4.

Campaign
The Liberals' early lead began to slip as Turner made several prominent gaffes. In particular, he spoke of creating new "make work programs", a concept from earlier decades that had been replaced by the less patronizing-sounding "job creation programs". He also was caught on camera patting Liberal Party president Iona Campagnolo on her posterior. Turner defended this action as being a friendly gesture, but it was seen by many as condescending.

Other voters turned against the Liberals due to their mounting legacy of patronage and corruption. An especially important issue was Trudeau's recommendation that Sauvé appoint over 200 Liberals to patronage posts just before he left office. This action enraged Canadians on all sides. Although Turner had the right to advise that the appointments be withdrawn (something that Sauvé would have had to do according to constitutional convention), he didn't do so, and in fact, appointed more than 70 Liberals to patronage posts himself despite a promise to bring a new way of politics to Ottawa. He cited a written agreement with Trudeau, claiming that if Trudeau had made the appointments, the Liberals would have almost certainly lost the election. However, the fact that Turner dropped the writ a year early hurt his argument.

Turner found out that Mulroney was allegedly setting up a patronage machine in anticipation of victory. At the English-language televised debate between Mulroney, Turner and New Democratic Party leader Ed Broadbent, Turner started to attack Mulroney on his patronage plans, comparing them to the patronage machine run by old Union Nationale in Quebec. However, Mulroney turned the tables by pointing to the raft of patronage appointments made on the advice of Trudeau and Turner. Claiming that he'd gone so far as to apologize for making light of "these horrible appointments," Mulroney demanded that Turner apologize to the country for not cancelling the appointments advised by Trudeau and for recommending his own appointments. Turner was visibly surprised, and could only reply that "I had no option" except to let the appointments stand. Mulroney famously responded:

You had an option, sir. You could have said, 'I am not going to do it. This is wrong for Canada, and I am not going to ask Canadians to pay the price.' You had an option, sir—to say 'no'—and you chose to say 'yes' to the old attitudes and the old stories of the Liberal Party. That sir, if I may say respectfully, that is not good enough for Canadians.

Turner, clearly flustered by this withering riposte from Mulroney, could only repeat "I had no option." A visibly angry Mulroney called this "an avowal of failure" and "a confession of non-leadership." He told Turner, "You had an option, sir. You could have done better." Mulroney's counterattack led most of the papers the next day; it was often paraphrased as "You had an option, sir; you could have said 'no'." Many observers saw this as the end of any realistic chance for Turner to stay in power.

Final days
The last days of the campaign saw multiple Liberal blunders pile together. Turner continued to refer to "make work projects" and made other gaffes that caused voters to see him as a relic from the past. Turner even rehired much of Trudeau's staff during the final weeks in an attempt to turn the tide, but this did nothing to reverse sliding poll numbers. Even Trudeau himself did not campaign for Turner, instead only making appearances to support Liberal candidates.

Besides the Tories, the NDP also benefited from the slip in Liberal support. Under Broadbent, the party had seen greater support in opinion polling than ever before, and had actually replaced the Liberals as the second party in much of western Canada.

National results

All numerical results from Elections Canada's Official Report on the Thirty-Third Election.

Notes:

"% change" refers to change from previous election.

x – less than 0.05% of the popular vote.

1 Tony Roman was elected in the Toronto-area riding of York North as a "coalition candidate", defeating incumbent PC MP John Gamble. Roman drew support from Progressive Conservatives who were upset by Gamble's extreme-right-wing views.

2 Results of the Parti nationaliste du Québec are compared to those of the Union Populaire in the 1980 election.

The Revolutionary Workers League fielded five candidates: Michel Dugré, Katy Le Rougetel, Larry Johnston, Bonnie Geddes and Bill Burgess. All appeared on the ballot as independent or non-affiliated candidates, as the party was unregistered.

Vote and seat summaries

Results by province

Notes
 Number of parties: 11
 First appearance: Confederation of Regions Party of Canada, Green Party of Canada, Party for the Commonwealth of Canada
 Final appearance: none
 First-and-only appearance: Parti nationaliste du Québec

10 closest ridings
 Renfrew—Nipissing—Pembroke, ON: Len Hopkins (Lib) def. Don Whillans (PC) by 38 votes 
 Ottawa Centre, ON: Mike Cassidy (NDP) def. Dan Chilcott (PC) by 54 votes 
 Nunatsiaq, NT: Thomas Suluk (PC) def. Robert Kuptana (Lib) by 247 votes 
 Prince Albert, SK: Stan Hovdebo (NDP) def. Gordon Dobrowolsky (PC) by 297 votes 
 Burin—St. George's, NF: Joe Price (PC) def. Roger Simmons (Lib) by 299 votes 
 The Battlefords—Meadow Lake, SK: John Gormley (PC) def. Doug Anguish (NDP) by 336 votes 
 Willowdale, ON: John Oostrom (PC) def. Jim Peterson (Lib) by 362 votes 
 Saskatoon East, SK: Don Ravis (PC) def. Colin Clay (NDP) by 417 votes 
 Humber—Port au Port—St. Barbe, NF: Brian Tobin (Lib) def. Mike Monaghan (PC) by 493 votes 
 Mackenzie, SK: Jack Scowen (PC) def. Mel McCorriston (NDP) by 555 votes

Results analysis

Liberals
Turner's inability to overcome the alleged resentment against Trudeau, combined with his own mistakes, resulted in a debacle for the Liberals. They lost over a third of their popular vote from 1980, falling from 44 percent to 28 percent. Their seat count fell from 135 at dissolution to 40, a loss of 95 seats—the second worst defeat of a sitting government in Canadian history at the time (after the 1935 election), and among the worst defeats ever suffered by a governing party in a Westminster system. It was the worst performance in their long history at the time; the 40 seats would be their smallest seat count until they won only 34 seats in 2011, when they also fell to third place in the seat count for the first time at the national level. Eleven members of Turner's cabinet were defeated.

Despite their hopes of winning more support in the West, the Liberals won only two seats west of Ontario. One of those belonged to Turner, who defeated Tory incumbent Bill Clarke in Vancouver Quadra by a fairly solid 3,200-vote margin. The other belonged to Lloyd Axworthy, who was re-elected in Winnipeg—Fort Garry by 2,300 votes.

Particularly shocking was the decimation of the Liberals in Quebec. They won only 17 seats, all but four in and around Montreal. The province had been the bedrock of Liberal support for almost a century; the 1958 Tory landslide was the only time since the 1896 election that the Liberals had not won the most seats in Quebec. They would not win the most seats in the province again until the 2015 election (albeit they won the province's popular vote in 2000). In Ontario, the Liberals won only 14 seats, nearly all of them in Metro Toronto.

Progressive Conservatives
Early in the election, Mulroney focused on adding Quebec nationalists to the traditional Tory coalition of western populist conservatives and fiscal conservatives from Ontario and the Atlantic provinces.

This strategy, as well as denouncing alleged corruption in the Liberal government, resulted in a major windfall for the Tories. They won 211 seats, three more than their previous record of 208 in 1958. They won both a majority of seats and at least a plurality of the popular vote in every province and territory, the only time in Canadian history a party has achieved this (the nearest previous occasion being in 1949, when only Alberta kept the Liberals from a clean sweep). They also won just over half the popular vote, the last time to date that a Canadian party has won a majority of the popular vote.

The Tories had a major breakthrough in Quebec, a province where they had been virtually unelectable for almost a century. However, Mulroney's promise of a new deal for Quebec caused the province to swing dramatically to support him. After winning only one seat out of 75 in 1980, the Tories won 58 seats in 1984, more than they had ever won in Quebec before. In many cases, ridings where few living residents had ever been represented by a Tory elected them by margins similar to those the Liberals had scored for years.

New Democrats
The NDP lost only one seat, which was far better than expected considering the size of the PC tidal wave. Historically, third parties do not do well in landslides. More importantly, their 30 seats were only ten behind the Liberals.

Despite losing less than a percentage point in terms of total vote share, the NDP still finished with less than two-thirds of the Liberals' popular vote. However, the NDP vote proved itself to be much more efficient since it was not as evenly distributed across the country. While they were a distant third everywhere east of Ontario, the NDP won only one seat fewer than the Liberals in Ontario despite finishing a distant third there as well. In Western Canada, the NDP were by far the second-largest party behind the Tories. Some NDP incumbents essentially held on to their own share of the vote, and simply had to survive a swing from Liberal to PC which in many cases proved insufficient to unseat the sitting New Democratic MP.

Although the NDP had long since established itself as the third major party in Canada, this was closer than any party had gotten to the Grits or Tories since 1921, when the Progressive Party briefly surpassed the Tories. This led to speculation that Canada was headed for a UK-style Labour–Conservative division, with the NDP knocking the Liberals down to third-party status. It would be as close as the NDP would get to becoming the Official Opposition until 2011, when the party gained the second-most seats in the House of Commons and the majority of seats in Quebec.

Other parties
The Social Credit Party, which for a long time had been the country's fourth-largest (and occasionally even third-largest) party, suffered a massive drop-off in support from the previous election, in which they had already lost a major share of the vote and all their remaining MPs. Having performed poorly in various by-elections in the years that followed, the party suffered a blow to its image in June 1983, when the party executive voted to re-admit a faction led by Holocaust denier James Keegstra. Party leader Martin Hattersley resigned in protest.

In Quebec, most of the support which had helped keep the party viable in its final years turned to the Progressive Conservatives. The party essentially disappeared there—even among ridings the party had won as recently as 1979, it could field only one candidate (who finished in last place). What remained of Social Credit essentially reverted to being a western-based party, which was only able to run 52 candidates in 51 ridings (with two Socreds standing in a British Columbia seat). It was its second-smallest slate since first running candidates east of Manitoba four decades earlier, and barely enough to allow Social Credit to retain its party registration. The party lost 92 percent of its vote from 1980 and dropped from fourth place to ninth in the popular vote. For all intents and purposes, this was the end of Social Credit as a viable national party. It would make a desultory final appearance in 1988 before collapsing altogether in 1993.

The satirical Rhinoceros Party, despite a slight drop in their popular vote tally from the previous election, recorded its highest-ever finish at a general election, finishing as the fourth-largest party. Of the minor parties, only the Parti nationaliste du Québec and the Confederation of Regions Party of Canada managed to record more votes per candidate than the Rhinos, and even then only by small margins.

The Parti nationaliste du Québec, a successor to the previous Quebec-nationalist Union populaire party, ran for the first (and, ultimately, only) time in this election. Despite getting nearly six times the votes that their predecessors did in 1980, and finishing fifth in the popular vote, like the Socreds they proved unable to compete with the Progressive Conservatives, and failed to win any seats. The party would eventually collapse in 1987, though several of its members, along with dissident Tories and Liberals, would go on to found the more successful Bloc Québécois.

The Confederation of Regions Party of Canada, formed mostly by disaffected former Socreds, were another party who debuted in this election. While they placed sixth in the popular vote and attracted a little over quadruple the vote of their forerunners, they still failed to seriously challenge for any seats. Much like the Socreds, they too disappeared from the national scene after 1988, though they continued on a regional level for several years afterwards.

See also
 
List of Canadian federal general elections
List of political parties in Canada
Leaders' debate on women's issues during the 1984 Canadian federal election campaign

Articles on parties' candidates in this election:

 Commonwealth
 Communist
 Libertarian
 Liberal
 Social Credit
 Progressive Conservative
 Rhinoceros

References

Further reading

External links
Riding map

 
Canadian federal elections by year
 
Federal election